Irish Continental Group plc is an Irish shipping and transport group. Operating roll on/roll off passenger, freight and container freight services on routes between Ireland, the United Kingdom and Continental Europe.  Irish Continental Group also operate container terminals in the ports of Dublin and Belfast.

History
Irish Continental Group was formed (as Irish Continental Line) as an Irish/Scandinavian joint venture in 1972 in order to provide a direct ferry link from Ireland to Continental Europe.

In 1988 Irish Continental Group was floated on the Irish Stock Exchange, followed in 1993 by a listing on the London Stock Exchange.

In 1992, ICG acquired the B&I Line, then owned by the Irish Government. This broadened the Group's activities to include the short sea links with the United Kingdom, Ireland's largest trading partner, and also extended the Group's operations into container transport and port operations.

Divisions
Irish Ferries
Chartering
Dublin Ferryport Terminals
Eucon
Belfast Container Terminal

References

Shipping companies of Ireland
Holding companies of Ireland
Holding companies established in 1972
Transport companies established in 1972
1972 establishments in Ireland
Irish brands
Dublin Docklands
1998 initial public offerings
Companies listed on Euronext Dublin